A Wrinkle in Time (Original Motion Picture Soundtrack) is the soundtrack album to the 2018 film of the same name. The soundtrack features seven original songs written for the film, as well as the film score by Ramin Djawadi. Walt Disney Records released the soundtrack digitally and on streaming services on March 9, 2018, and physically released it on CD on March 30.

Track listing

Track listing adapted from Complex.com

Charts

References

2018 soundtrack albums
Disney film soundtracks
Ramin Djawadi soundtracks
Walt Disney Records soundtracks